Eugène Goüin (1818 – 1909 in Paris) was a French banker and politician.

Life
Son of the minister Alexandre Goüin, he was member of the municipal council of Tours from 1848 and president of the Tribunal (1856–1879) and Chamber of Commerce (1858–1879) of Tours.

He was mayor of Tours (1866–1875), deputy for the department of Indre-et-Loire (1871–1875) and sénateur inamovible (1875–1909).

Goüin has founder and chairman of Banque de Paris et des Pays-Bas (1895–1909), chairman of the Supervisory committee of Caisse des dépôts et consignations (1888–1909), vice chairman of Chemins de fer de Paris à Lyon et à la Méditerranée, member of the board of Caisse d'Epargne, Banque de l'Indochine, ...

See also
Hôtel Goüin

References

1818 births
1909 deaths
Businesspeople from Tours, France
Members of the National Assembly (1871)
French life senators
Mayors of places in Centre-Val de Loire
French bankers
Knights Grand Cross of the Order of Isabella the Catholic
Recipients of the Order of St. Anna, 1st class
Officiers of the Légion d'honneur
Politicians from Tours, France